Statistics of Latvian Higher League in the 1938–39 season.

Overview
It was contested by 8 teams, and Olimpija won the championship.

League standings

References
RSSSF

Latvian Higher League seasons
1939 in Latvian football
1938 in Latvian football
Latvia